Williams Fork Reservoir, located near the town of Parshall in Grand County, Colorado, is owned and operated by Denver Water. The reservoir impounds the Williams Fork of the Colorado River.

Geography
With a  shoreline, the reservoir's surface area is 1,860 acres.

Williams Fork Dam and Power Plant
The Williams Fork Dam and Power Plant, completed in 1959, provides electricity and water to the Western Slope or Denver metropolitan area in Colorado. It's a concrete dam, 217 feet high and with a length of 600 feet at its crest.  The reservoir impounds about 97,000 acre feet of water (one acre foot=325,851 gallons), and the power plant contains a 3,158-kilowatt generator.

Recreactional Activities
Water based activities include motor boating, fishing, ice fishing and wind surfing. The lake is stocked for fishing by the Colorado Division of Wildlife. Tent, trailer and recreational vehicle (RV) camping and picnic sites are available.

See also
List of largest reservoirs of Colorado
 Phillips-Williams Fork Reservoir Site
 Williams Fork (Colorado River)
 List of reservoirs in Colorado

References

Reservoirs in Colorado
Protected areas of Grand County, Colorado
Dams in Colorado
United States local public utility dams
Lakes of Grand County, Colorado
1959 establishments in Colorado